hewow everybody :33

Tied aid is foreign aid that must be spent on products & services provided by companies that are from the country providing the aid (the donor country) or in a group of selected countries. A developed country will provide a bilateral loan or grant to a developing country, but mandate that the money be spent on goods or services produced in the selected country. From this it follows that untied aid has no geographical limitations.

In 2006, the Organisation for Economic Co-operation and Development (OECD) estimated that 41.7 percent of Official Development Assistance is untied.

Definition
The full definition of tied aid as defined by OECD is:

Tied aid credits are official or officially supported Loans, credits or Associated Financing packages where procurement of the goods or services involved is limited to the donor country or to a group of countries which does not include substantially all developing countries (or Central and Eastern European Countries (CEECs)/New Independent States (NIS) in transition).

Motivations

In the OECD report The Tying of Aid it was found that the motivations for tying aid were both economical and political. From an economic point of view, the donor country aims to raise its own exports. However, the study found that the exports related to tied aid were minimal. It referred to an earlier study that looked at the relation between exports from nine representative European donors and 32 representative developing countries. That study found that exports connected to tied aid constituted about 4 percent of the total. The Tying of Aid thus concluded that the more important reason for the practice was political. Historical relations, trade relationships, geopolitical interests and cultural ties are all examples of the political motivations behind the tying of aid, but according to Jepma, they all boiled down to the same thing: 
Although most donors give aid to quite a wide variety of recipients, the importance they attach to individual recipients clearly differs: donors support countries with which they have, or hope to have, strong ties.

Costs to the recipients of aid

It is difficult to make a correct estimate on the related costs to the recipient for various reasons. One of these, is that even though a donor ties its aid, it might be that the donor has the most competitive prices in any case. Another factor is the ability a donor has to enforce the tying of aid in the recipient country. Even so, the OECD has made some general remarks on the costs:

Aid tying by OECD donor countries has important consequences for developing countries. Tying aid to specific commodities and services, or to procurement in a specific country or region, can increase development project costs by as much as 20 to 30 per cent.

If donors claim that 42 percent of bilateral aid is untied, one can assume that the remaining 58 is tied. In 2004, total bilateral aid amounted to US$79.5 billion. In the worst-case scenario of OECD, the tying of aid can reduce its value by as much as 30 percent. If that was true in all cases, that translates into a US$13.9 billion reduced value of aid for the recipients. If the value on an average only is reduced by 20 percent, it would equal US$9.2 billion.

The problems of untying aid
The tying of aid is a form of protectionism; however, the literature on this particular subject is rather scanty. One of the major problems in the untying of aid is the prisoner's dilemma. Those donors that want to abolish the practice will see their own interests damaged if the other donors do not follow.

In 2001, the donor members of the Development Assistance Committee (DAC), a subcommittee of the OECD, agreed to virtually untie all aid to the Least Developed Countries. That Recommendation entered into effect on January 1, 2002. In addition, Australia, Finland, France, Germany, Ireland, Japan, the Netherlands, Norway, Portugal, Sweden, Switzerland and the United Kingdom have untied their aid beyond the requirements of the Recommendation.

Further progress on this particular issue is being implemented as part of the Paris Declaration on Aid Effectiveness. However, of the 12 indicators included, the untying of bilateral aid is the only item without a deadline for its completion.

Arguments for and against tied aid

Tied aid increases the cost of assistance and has the tendency of making donors focus more on the commercial advancement of their countries than what developing countries need.  When recipient nations are required to spend aid on products from the donor nation, project costs can be raised by up to 30 percent.  Tied aid can create distortions in the market and impede the recipient country's ability to spend the aid they receive.  There are growing concerns about the use of tied aid and efforts to analyze the quality of aid given, rather than simply the quantity. The Commitment to Development Index, which measures the "development friendliness" of rich countries, actually penalizes donor governments for tied aid in the calculation of the index.

Others have argued that tying aid to donor-country products is common sense; it is a strategic use of aid to promote donor country's business or exports.  It is further argued that tied aid if well designed and effectively managed, would not necessarily compromise the quality as well as the effectiveness of aid (Aryeetey, 1995; Sowa 1997).  However, this argument would hold particularly for programme aid, where aid is tied to a specific projects or policies and where there is little or no commercial interest.  It must be emphasized however, that commercial interest and aid effectiveness are two different things and it would be difficult to pursue commercial interest without compromising aid effectiveness. Thus, the idea of maximizing development should be separated from the notion of pursuing commercial interest.  Tied aid improves donors export performance, creates business for local companies and jobs.  It also helps to expose firms, which have not had any international experience on the global market to do so.

Examples
In the UK, the Overseas Development Administration (ODA), was under the supervision of the Foreign Secretary and the Foreign and Commonwealth Office, which led, on at least one occasion, to allegations of a connection between the granting of aid and the achievement of either foreign policy goals or British companies winning export orders.  A scandal erupted concerning the UK funding of a hydroelectric dam on the Pergau River in Malaysia, near the Thai border.  Building work began in 1991 with money from the UK foreign aid budget.  Concurrently, the Malaysian government bought around £1 billion worth of arms from the UK.  The suggested linkage of arms deals to aid became the subject of a UK government inquiry from March 1994.  In November 1994, after an application for Judicial Review brought by the World Development Movement, the High Court held that the then Foreign Secretary, Douglas Hurd had acted ultra vires (outside of his power and therefore illegally) by allocating £234 million towards the funding of the dam, on the grounds that it was not of economic or humanitarian benefit to the Malaysian people . In 1997 the administration of the UK's aid budget was removed from the Foreign Secretary's remit with the establishment of the Department for International Development (DfID) which replaced the ODA.

Tied aid is now illegal in the UK by virtue of the International Development Act, which came into force on 17 June 2002, replacing the Overseas Development and Co-operation Act (1980)yA.

See also
Untied aid
Aid

Notes and references

External links
 OECD/DAC Untied Aid Web site
 The Paris Declaration
 DFID Homepage
 Organisational chart
 Article on DFID's use of consultants

International development
Aid
Anti-corruption measures